The Washington State Department of Natural Resources (DNR) manages over  of forest, range, agricultural, and commercial lands in the U.S. state of Washington. The DNR also manages  of aquatic areas which include shorelines, tidelands, lands under Puget Sound and the coast, and navigable lakes and rivers. Part of the DNR's management responsibility includes monitoring of mining cleanup, environmental restoration, providing scientific information about earthquakes, landslides, and ecologically sensitive areas. DNR also works towards conservation, in the form of Aquatic Reserves such as Maury Island and in the form of Natural Area Preserves like Mima Mounds or Natural Resource Conservation Areas like Woodard Bay Natural Resource Conservation Area.

The Department was created in 1957 to manage state trust lands for the people of Washington. DNR management of state-owned forests, farms, rangeland, aquatic, and commercial lands generates more than $200 million in annual revenue for public schools, state institutions, and county services. DNR is also Washington's largest firefighting force, with more than 1,500 firefighters who control wildland fires for more than 13 million acres of private and state-owned forest lands.

The main sources of funds for the department's activities are forestry and geoduck harvesting, rather than taxes. In addition, the State uses revenue generated from DNR-managed lands to fund the construction of public schools, colleges, universities, and other government institutions, and county and state services.

Commissioner of Public Lands 
The head of DNR is an elected constitutional officer known as "the Commissioner of Public Lands". Fourteen individuals have served the State of Washington as Commissioner of Public Lands, two of whom (Taylor and Case) served non-consecutive terms. Otto A. Case also served as Washington State Treasurer from 1933–1937 and 1941–1945. The Commissioner of Public Lands is seventh  in the line of succession to the office of Governor of Washington, immediately after the Superintendent of Public Instruction. The current Commissioner of Public Lands is Hilary Franz, who was elected on November 8, 2016.

Divisions
 Aquatic Resources
 Conservation, Recreation, and Transactions
 Engineering and General Services
 Financial Management
 Forest Practices
 Forest Resources
 Geology and Earth Resources (often abbreviated as "DGER")
 Human Resources
 Information Technology
 Product Sales and Leasing

Management of public lands

Aquatic reserves
The Department of Natural Resources has established aquatic reserves throughout the state to protect important native ecosystems on state-owned aquatic lands. Through its aquatic reserves, DNR promotes the preservation, restoration, and enhancement of state-owned aquatic lands that are of special educational, scientific, or environmental interest. Managing aquatic reserves does not affect private or other adjacent land ownership.

Law enforcement
DNR employs approximately 10 law enforcement officers who are located throughout the state. These officers patrol lands owned or managed by the DNR. DNR officers are full-authority law enforcement officers while they are on DNR lands. Under state law DNR officers are considered to be limited authority law enforcement officers since their state law enforcement authority is only applicable on lands owned by DNR. The majority of the county sheriffs in Washington have commissioned all of their local DNR officers as county deputies allowing them to act as a full authority law enforcement officer throughout the county, not only on DNR lands. DNR officers are dispatched by the Washington State Patrol.

Natural hazards
The DNR maintains a portal with natural hazard information for the public including tsunamis; landslides and earthquakes; volcanoes and lahars; and "mineral hazards" (asbestos, heavy metals and naturally occurring uranium, and radon gas) in the State of Washington.

References

External links
 

Natural Resources
State environmental protection agencies of the United States
Natural resources agencies in the United States